The 300th Guards Mechanized Regiment was a formation of the Ukrainian Ground Forces. The full name of the regiment is the 300th Separate Guards Mechanized Budapest Regiment.

History
The Regiment was formed as 145th Guards Training Motor-Rifle Budapest Regiment. 145 Guards TMRR was previously 145th Guards Rifle Regiment, part of 66th Guards Motor Rifle Training Division, the former 66th Guards Rifle Division. After October 30, 2000, by the order of the President of Ukraine, the name of the Regiment was changed to 300th Separate Guards Mechanized Budapest Regiment.

The regiment was disbanded on 30 October 2013. The  of the 80th Separate Air Assault Brigade was later established on the remains of the regiment.

References

Further reading
Information about one of 66th Guards Rifle Division's regiments

Regiments of Ukraine
Military units and formations established in 1992
Military units and formations disestablished in 2013